Lembit is an Estonian masculine given name.

Lembit may also refer to:
(et), the first combat ship of the Estonian Navy, formerly the gunboat Bobr of the Russian Imperial Navy
, Estonian Navy submarine, commissioned in 1937 and now a museum ship